Newton upon Derwent or Newton on Derwent is a village and civil parish in the East Riding of Yorkshire, England. It lies 1 mile east of the River Derwent after which the village takes its name.

According to the 2011 UK census, Newton upon Derwent parish had a population of 315, an increase on the 2001 UK census figure of 282.

References

External links
 Newton upon Derwent's Parish Council

Villages in the East Riding of Yorkshire
Civil parishes in the East Riding of Yorkshire